San Jose, officially the Municipality of San Jose,  is a 1st class municipality in the province of Occidental Mindoro, Philippines. According to the 2020 census, it has a population of 153,267, representing a third of the provincial population, and is the largest among cities (excluding Puerto Princesa City) and municipalities in the Mimaropa region.

San Jose has the province's largest commercial port and airport, the most banking, business, dining and commercial establishments in Occidental Mindoro, and has become a center of trade in the Mimaropa region. Its major local and international exports include rice, salt and processed milkfish. It was ranked 13th in "overall competitiveness" among Philippine local government units in the 2017 Cities and Municipalities Competitiveness Index (CMCI).

In pre-colonial times, it was named Pandurucan by the indigenous Mangyans after the local river, before later renamed for its patron saint, St. Joseph, the husband of Mary.

History 
Historical records show that in the 14th century, Chinese traders anchored to trade at the shores of Mangarin, the oldest settlement in the southern portion of Occidental Mindoro. Its name was derived from the word “Mandarin”, an official Chinese Palace, the remains of which can still be found in the old barrio of Mangarin. The area was once a Sinified Buddhist state called Ma-i before the Sultanate of Brunei invaded. When the Spanish took possession of the Island in the 18th century, the first site of the Presidencia was built in sitio of Sinaoga, on the western side of Barrio Santa Teresa, now part of the municipality of Magsaysay. A year later, it was again transferred to Caminawit.

Archaeological evidence from caves and rockshelter sites in the island of Ilin indicate human habitation dating back thousands of years (Middle Holocene period, about 6,000 years ago).

American occupation 

On May 1, 1910, Pandurucan, which was renamed San Jose, became the seat of the Civil Government with Don German Ramirez as its first appointed leader up to 1915. When the Japanese Imperial Forces occupied the town, Bonifacio Gomez was appointed as Mayor from 1941 to 1942, followed by Pedro Cuden, 1942–1943 and finally Isabelo Abeleda, in 1944 until 1946. During the American reoccupation Bibiano Gaudiel replaced Isabelo Abeleda who regained his position in 1955.

World War II 

San Jose figures prominently in Philippine history for its role during World War II. American naval forces led by General Douglas MacArthur staged a so-called "Second Landing" in the beaches of San Jose (the "First" being the famous Leyte Landing) on December 15, 1944, to retake the Philippine islands from the Japanese (the Battle of Mindoro). Securing San Jose and the whole Mindoro island proved decisive in the goal to recapture Manila and Luzon, and the eventual defeat of the Japanese Imperial forces by Filipino and American troops.

Contemporary history 
In 1950, the Philippine government split Mindoro into two provinces, Occidental Mindoro and Oriental Mindoro. San Jose became the temporary capital until it was later transferred to Mamburao. With encouragement from the national government, migration into Mindoro in the years after World War II boosted population growth and spurred development. The Philippine Sugar Mill plantation in the northern Barangay Central helped San Jose become the center of commerce in those years.

On April 3, 1969, the barrios of Alibog, Caguray, Calawag, Gapasan, Laste, Lourdes, Nicolas, Paclolo, Purnaga, Sibalat, and Santa Teresa was separated from San Jose to create a separate municipality known as Magsaysay.

During the 1970s, development has since shifted to what is now the poblacion area and neighboring barangays. The economic base also has widened to include rice, corn, tobacco, salt, and aquaculture production geared towards both the local Philippine and international markets.

Conversion into a city 
The Municipality of San Jose passed Resolution No. 0023 in 2001, seeking conversion to city status. In 2016, Congresswoman Josephine Ramirez-Sato filed House Bill No. 2164 which aims to convert San Jose into a component city.

Geography
San Jose is bordered on the north by the municipalities of Rizal and Calintaan, on the east by the municipalities of Mansalay and Bulalacao, on the south by the municipality of Magsaysay, and on the west by the Mindoro Strait. Its jurisdiction includes Ambulong and Ilin Islands.

Climatic condition is classified under Type A category and slope is generally flat. Soil composition developed from recent alluvial deposits which are silty-loam to clay loam and landforms consist of limestone and sedimentary rocks. All types of erosion are present: slight, moderate and severe erosion. Eleven (11) rivers and creeks, including the Pandurucan River which runs through the center of town,  serve as natural drainage. Mineral deposits includes copper and limestone.

Climate

San Jose has a tropical monsoon climate (Köppen climate classification Am). The average annual temperature is 27.5 °C. The warmest month of the year is May, with an average temperature of 28.9 °C. January has the lowest average temperature of the year, at 26.5 °C. The average annual rainfall is 3126 mm. The driest month is March, with 8 mm of rainfall. With an average of 714 mm, the most precipitation falls in July.

Barangays

San Jose is politically subdivided into 39 barangays as of May 2, 2019. Barangay Naibuan ( 175110040) was created by virtue of Presidential Memorandum Order No. 19, series of 2018, pursuant to Sangguniang Panlalawigan Resolution No. 138, series of 2007 and ratified through a plebiscite on January 5, 2018.

Demographics

San Jose is the most densely populated area in the province of Occidental Mindoro, with a 2.38% annual growth. Out of the total population of 143,430 people, about 42% reside in urban area while 58% are situated in rural barangays. The majority of the population consists of a mix of migrants of different ethnolinguistic groups from nearby provinces, namely: Tagalogs,  Bicolanos, Visayans, Kapampangans, Pangasinans and Ilocanos. Some 2% of its population belong to the indigenous Mangyan peoples, primarily the Hanunuo and Buhid tribes.

Average household size is recorded at 5 with an urban density of 6500 persons per km2. About 69% are dependents, resulting to a dependency ratio of 1:2. On the other hand, male-female ratio is computed at 108:100.

Tagalog is the most spoken language and 83.97% are practicing Roman Catholicism, pastorally served since 1983 by the Apostolic Vicariate of San Jose in Mindoro, with its own titular church, the Saint Joseph the Worker Cathedral.

Economy

The municipality has diverse economic activities. However, the majority of the working force which is estimated at 76%, are still engaged in agriculture. Like the rest of the province, other industries in San Jose are tied to the town's agricultural base. A substantial majority of palay and rice of Occidental Mindoro, a major supplier of rice for Manila and elsewhere, are delivered, milled, traded and sold in San Jose.

Other major agricultural products include corn, garlic, onions, and root crops. Aquaculture is well-developed in San Jose which is known for its export quality lapu-lapu, bangus (milkfish), and sugpo (prawn). The town has abundant coastal and marine resources which provide an ample supply of fish and marine products for local consumption and exports.

Commercial livestock and poultry farms producing layers, broilers and meat products also exist. San Jose has a large number of agricultural support facilities such as rice mills, warehouses, solar dryers, and the like.

Registered commercial establishments number more than a thousand, and the public market, the center of commercial activities, is the largest in the province of Occidental Mindoro. Major fast food chains, including Jollibee, Chowking, Mang Inasal, McDonald's , Goldilocks, Hen Lin and local restaurants, serve residents and tourists alike, while malls such as UNITOP Dept. and Gaisano Capital offer shopping conveniences. Andok's and chooks to go are also operating in San Jose.

Major banks such as Landbank, Chinabank, Veterans Bank, Citystate Savings Bank, Development Bank of the Philippines (DBP), Philippine National Bank (PNB), United Coco Planters Bank (UCPB), ChinaBank Savings (CBS), Metrobank, Rizal Bank (RCBC), BanKo (BPI), Card Bank Inc and other Rural Banks are also operating in San Jose.

Other industries include hollow blocks making, handicrafts, furniture, sweet goods and other food products (pasalubong), and other small-scale enterprises and home-based businesses.

Economic growth is likely to rise in the next decade with the influx of business interests, along with planned power and water supply improvements.

Transportation

San Jose is accessible via the West Mindoro Coastal Road/Occidental Mindoro National Highway and the Philippine Nautical Highway System.

The town is served by the San Jose Airport,by Cebu Pacific  with regular scheduled flights to Manila. A new route was opened by Philippine Airlines connecting the town to Clark International Airport in Pampanga, with five regular weekly flight schedules. San Jose is also served by its seaport, Caminawit Port.

Education
Major educational institutions in the province include Occidental Mindoro State College (OMSC), Divine Word College of San Jose (DWC), San Jose Adventist Academy Inc. (SJAA), Montessori de San Jose, Philippine Central Islands College (PCIC), I-NET Asia Technological School, Inc., Southwest Philippines Ecumenical School Inc., Abeleda Technical School, Grace Christian School and Maranatha Christian Academy.

References

 http://www.blgf.gov.ph/downloads/lgudata/SIE01-04/2011eSRE.xls
 http://www.cmcindex.org.ph/pages/profile/?lgu=San%20Jose%20(OM)
 https://www.researchgate.net/publication/274961318_Shell_tool_technology_in_Island_Southeast_Asia_an_early_Middle_Holocene_Tridacna_adze_from_Ilin_Island_Mindoro_Philippines

External links

San Jose Profile at PhilAtlas.com
Philippine Census Information
Local Governance Performance Management System

Municipalities of Occidental Mindoro